The Supermen of America is the name of two fictional superhero teams published by DC Comics. The original group first appeared in a special written by Stuart Immonen published in 1999, and a later mini-series written by Fabian Nicieza, which was published in 2000. The second group debuted in Superman #714 in 2011.

The Supermen of America appear in the second season of the television series Superman & Lois.

Historical Supermen

The original Supermen of America was an official Superman fan club from the 1940s. Comic readers could send away for and receive special membership cards that also doubled as decoders. Members also received buttons and special certificates.

Fictional history

Original team
The young members of the superhero team Supermen of America are all young metahumans gathered by Outburst after the shooting death of singer Junior K-D from the boy band Crossfire. Outburst and his family had been saved from death at Doomsday's hands by Superman. The young naive meta is willing to accept Lex Luthor's funding for a team of superheroes to protect the city in Superman's absence. Although Luthor volunteered money, Outburst is tasked with recruiting the members.

Outburst first recruits his girlfriend White Lotus, a young meta trained by the Warlords of Okaara, then he gathers Brahma, Loser, Pyrogen, and Psilencer. They were salaried heroes but they were determined to protect the city from villains emboldened by news of Superman's apparent death.

They refurbish buildings across Metropolis and turn them into community centers. The main building Outreach 1 serves as the team's headquarters. After Psilencer's untimely death by a gang member, Outburst and his inexperienced teammates are deeply shaken and reconsider their vocation. It was around this time that the team met and recruits Maximum, the angry young protector of Suicide Slum, a chronically poor section of Metropolis. A former athlete, Maximum would have remained quadriplegic without special implants provided by Lexcorp.

A disgruntled Lexcorp employee discovers that S.T.A.R. Labs had hidden a capsule inside a special holding chamber called Lockdown 6 in the waters near Metropolis. Luthor successfully deploys Pyrogen to retrieve the capsule from Lockdown 6, but he encounters the villainous group Deep Six and is rebuffed. Darkseid, lord of Apokolips, also wanted the contents of Lockdown 6 and had sent the Deep Six to retrieve them. In the Vega system, the Warlords of Okaara sense the danger presented by the capsule, and take preventative measures.

The Okaarans overpower Earth's defensive forces and White Lotus hurries to negotiate a peace settlement before they "cleanse' the planet. To save Earth from worse attacks, while White Lotus was negotiating with the Okaarans, the chamber is opened and the Unimaginable was unleashed. The Unimaginable's energy form possesses Maximum and he temporarily gains immense power. Maximum's parents eventually convinced him to relinquish the power, which he disperses safely.

In exchange for the Supermen's silence about his involvement with the Unimaginable fiasco, Lexcorp cuts its ties with the Supermen of America charities. Lex Luthor signs all property deeds over to the organization, including Outreach 1.

Current status
Several members of the group are seen during the 2006 Infinite Crisis event in the pages of The OMAC Project No. 6. The team is confronting several OMACs, technologically advanced warriors controlled by a central intelligence that wishes to corral superhuman activities, even it means using murder. The OMACs analysis states the team is "67.89% neutralized". White Lotus is shown upright and active. Brahma and Outburst are clearly down. Loser is being attacked by two OMACs. Outside of a passing reference in a subsequent issue of Superman, wherein it is mentioned Superman went to check on the team—however much there was left at that point—the final fate of the SoA remains unrevealed.

Second team

After a months-long walk across the US, Superman recruits several allies into a new group named after the former SoA.

Membership

Original team members
 Outburst (Mitch Anderson) – Outburst is the team leader and has  magnetism manipulation.
 White Lotus (Nona Lin-Baker) – White Lotus has a malleable Auric forcefield and was trained in martial arts by the Warlords of Okaara. She was the offspring of African-American and Asian parents.
 Brahma (Cal Usjak) – Brahma is originally super strong and invulnerable. In the mini-series he discovered the ability to change his size as well, but the larger he grew the more petrified and stonelike his form became.
 Pyrogen (Claudio Tielli) – Pyrogen is a powerful fire manipulator and a hothead.
 Loser (Theo Storm) – Loser possesses a powerful dermal force field capable of withstanding anti-matter.
 Psilencer (Tim Thomas Townsend) – Psilencer is a prescient telepath and team tactician, killed by a gang member.

Later additions
 Maximum (Max Williams) – Maximum is an African-American teenager created by Fabian Nicieza for the mini-series. Maximum's powers closely resembled those of Ultra Boy from the Legion of Superheroes. Max's powers come directly from Lexcorp, he can channel his special energies to increase his speed strength or senses to superhuman levels, but only one at a time.

Second team members
 Superman (Kal-El/Clark Kent)
 Superboy (Kon-El/Conner Kent)
 Supergirl (Kara Zor-El/Linda Lang)
 Steel (John Henry Irons)
 Livewire (Leslie Willis)
 Arnold "Iron" Munro
 Super-Chief (Saganowhana)

In other media
Mitch Anderson (portrayed by Ian Bohen) and a variation of the Supermen of America appear in the Arrowverse television series Superman & Lois. The team were created when Superman refused to put American interests first. The members consist of Tag Harris (portrayed by Wern Lee), Jesse Vance (portrayed by Evelyn Gonda), and an unnamed male (portrayed by Dominique Termansen) who all possess Kryptonian abilities. Tag was introduced in the first season in which he was exposed to yellow phosphorescence the same time Superman's son Jordan Kent discovered his abilities while the latter two received X-Kryptonite from Anderson and were trained in secret by the Department of Defence (D.O.D.). In an attempt to kill Superman's Inverse World counterpart, Jessie and her teammate were killed leaving Tag only severely injured and rescued by Superman. Following these events, a funeral was held for Jessie and her teammate as Tag remains hospitalised. Bitter over Superman's refusal to trust him after the deaths of his soldiers, Anderson briefly allied himself with cult leader Ally Allston until he realised her true intentions and sided with Superman before being killed by the Inverse World counterpart of Superman's other son Jon-EL.

References

External links
 DCU Guide entry for Supermen of America Special #1
 DCU Guide entry for Supermen of America mini-series

DC Comics superhero teams
DC Comics titles